Fess Williams and His Joy Boys was a band of clarinetist Fess Williams during 1928.

Brief history
During 1928 Williams took a short break from leading the Royal Flush Orchestra to front Dave Peyton's band in Chicago at the Regal Theatre under the name Fess Williams and His Joy Boys. During this time they recorded two sides on Vocalion Records, Dixie Stomp and Drifting and Dreaming. While still in Chicago he continued to play at the Savoy as the Royal Flush.

Band members
Eddie Atkins 	     - Trombone
Ralph Brown 	     - Alto Saxophone
Lawrence Dixon      - Banjo, Vocals
William Franklin    - Trombone
Clarence Lee 	     - Violin
Joe McCutchin       - Violin
Norvel Morton       - Tenor Saxophone, Flute
Sudie Reynaud       - Bass
Fats Robin          - Trumpet
Ruben Reeves        - Trumpet
Jasper Taylor       - Drums
Bobby Wall 	     - Violin
Professor Stanley Williams 	- Clarinet, Leader

References

External links
Fess Williams and His Joy Boys At Red Hot Jazz Archive

American jazz ensembles from Illinois